United Left Extremadura is the Extremaduran federation of the Spanish left wing political and social movement United Left. Joaquín Macías is the current General Coordinator.

The Communist Party of Extremadura (PCEx, Extremaduran federation of PCE) is the major member of the coalition.

María Teresa Rejas of the United List became the first woman to serve as president of the Assembly of Extremadura.

See also
United Left (Spain)
Communist Party of Extremadura

References

External links
Official website.

2012 establishments in Spain
Extremadura
Political parties established in 2012
Political parties in Extremadura
Socialist parties in Spain